Cirsium purpuratum is a species of plume thistle native to Japan.

References

    

Cirsium